Deem in law is used to treat something as if it were really something else or it has qualities it does not have.

Deem has been traditionally considered to be a useful word when it is necessary to establish a legal fiction either positively by "deeming" something to be what it is not or negatively by "deeming" something not to be what it is. All other uses of the word should be avoided. Phrases
like “if he deems fit”, “as he deems necessary”, or “nothing in this Act shall be deemed to...” are objectionable as unnecessary deviations from common language. "Thinks" or "considers" are preferable in the first two examples and "construed" or "interpreted" in the third.

Examples 
In Article 10 of the Treaty of Taipei, the inhabitants of Taiwan and Penghu are deemed to be nationals of the Republic of China. Wajima further explained that because the future ownership of the territorial sovereignty over Taiwan and Penghu are unclear, the inhabitants' nationalities would become unclear once they lose Japanese nationalities due to the two territories being renounced by Japan, causing their inconveniences when they are traveling to other countries. Therefore, according to Wajima, the Article makes the inhabitants of Taiwan and Penghu deemed to be nationals of the Republic of China and the purpose of the Article is not to define who the nationals of the Republic of China are.

See also 

De jure
De facto

References 

Common law legal terminology